Clarence "C. J." Board (born December 12, 1993) is an American football wide receiver for the Tennessee Titans of the National Football League (NFL). He played college football at Chattanooga.

Professional career

Baltimore Ravens
Board signed with the Baltimore Ravens as an undrafted free agent on May 4, 2017. He was waived by the Ravens on September 1, 2017.

Tennessee Titans
On October 4, 2017, Board was signed to the Tennessee Titans' practice squad. He was released on November 28, 2017.

Cleveland Browns
On December 26, 2017, Board was signed to the Cleveland Browns' practice squad. He signed a future/reserve contract with the Browns on January 1, 2018.

On August 31, 2018, Board was waived/injured by the Browns and was placed on injured reserve. He was released on September 11, 2018.

Jacksonville Jaguars
On December 10, 2018, Board was signed to the Jacksonville Jaguars practice squad. He signed a reserve/future contract with the Jaguars on December 31, 2018.

On November 25, 2019, Board was waived by the Jaguars and re-signed to the practice squad. He was promoted to the active roster on December 12, 2019. He was waived on August 12, 2020.

New York Giants 
Board was claimed off waivers by the New York Giants on August 13, 2020. He re-signed with the team on March 17, 2021. He was released on September 7, 2021 and re-signed to the practice squad. He was signed to the active roster on September 25. On week 6 against the Los Angeles Rams Board fractured his forearm and was placed on injured reserve.

Board re-signed with the Giants on March 14, 2022. He was waived on August 30, 2022 and signed to the practice squad the next day. He was released on September 6.

Arizona Cardinals
On September 21, 2022, Board was signed to the Arizona Cardinals practice squad. He was released on October 10.

Tennessee Titans (second stint)
On October 17, 2022, Board was signed to the Tennessee Titans practice squad. He was promoted to the active roster on November 17. He was placed on injured reserve a month later.

References

External links
New York Giants bio

1993 births
Living people
African-American players of American football
American football wide receivers
Arizona Cardinals players
Baltimore Ravens players
Chattanooga Mocs football players
Cleveland Browns players
Jacksonville Jaguars players
New York Giants players
People from Clarksville, Tennessee
Players of American football from Tennessee
Tennessee Titans players
21st-century African-American sportspeople